John Wentworth may refer to:

People associated with New Hampshire
John Wentworth (lieutenant governor, born 1671) (1671–1730), lieutenant governor of New Hampshire from 1717 to 1730; grandfather of Sir John Wentworth
Sir John Wentworth, 1st Baronet (1737–1820), governor of New Hampshire from  1767 to 1775 and Nova Scotia from 1792 to 1808; grandson of the earlier lieutenant governor
John Wentworth (judge) (1719–1781), jurist and revolutionary leader in New Hampshire; father of the Continental Congress delegate
John Wentworth Jr. (1745–1787), Continental Congress delegate from New Hampshire; son of the above judge 

People in other locations
John Wentworth (MP for Bishop's Lynn), see King's Lynn (UK Parliament constituency)
John Wentworth (died 1613), MP
John Wentworth (died 1651), MP for Great Yarmouth (UK Parliament constituency)
John Wentworth (Illinois politician) (1815–1888), Chicago mayor and U.S. congressman
John Wentworth (actor) (1908–1989), British television actor

See also
 John Wentworth Loring (1775–1852), Royal Navy officer
 John Wentworth-FitzWilliam (1852–1889), British Liberal politician
 New Hampshire Route 109, a segment of which is signed as "The Governor John Wentworth Highway"